The 1878 Kentucky Derby was the 4th running of the Kentucky Derby. The race took place on May 21, 1878. Winning horse Day Star set a new Kentucky Derby record with a winning time of 2:37.25.

Full results

Payout

The winner received a purse of $4,050.
Second place received $200.

References

1878
Kentucky Derby
May 1878 sports events
Derby